The Sindh River, a tributary of the Yamuna River, flows through the Indian states of Madhya Pradesh and Uttar Pradesh.

Course
The Sindh originates on the Malwa Plateau in Vidisha district, and flows north-northeast through the districts of Guna, Ashoknagar, Shivpuri, Datia, Gwalior and Bhind in Madhya Pradesh to join the Yamuna River in Jalaun district, Uttar Pradesh, just after the confluence of the Chambal River with the Yamuna River.

Tributaries
The major tributaries of the Sindh are the Parbati, Pahuj, Kwari (Kunwari), and Mahuar.  The Mahuar River is also locally known as the Samoha River and passes through the former Karera Wildlife Sanctuary.

Dam
Manikheda Dam has been constructed across the Sindh River in Shivpuri district and a Pickup Dam named as Mohini Sagar is situated downstream.

Notes and references

Rivers of Madhya Pradesh
Tributaries of the Yamuna River
Rivers of Uttar Pradesh
Rivers of India